Caleb Chan is a Canadian composer and multi-instrumentalist. He is best known as the composer for Sam Raimi's Roku series 50 States of Fright. He has worked extensively on animated series such as Netflix's Angry Birds: Summer Madness, DreamWorks Animation's Team Zenko Go and Apple TV's Pinecone & Pony. He was also a longtime contributor to the My Little Pony: Friendship is Magic franchise. He has been nominated four times for a Leo Award for Best Music in an Animation Program.

Early life and education

Chan attended the University of British Columbia, Trinity Western University, and the University of Toronto where he graduated with a master's degree in music composition.

Career
Chan's concert works are influenced by Chinese folk music and Western popular music. He is also a frequent collaborator with indie artists, often arranging and performing string parts.

References

External links

Living people
Canadian film score composers
Male film score composers
Canadian television composers
Male television composers
Musicians from Vancouver
21st-century classical composers
Place of birth missing (living people)
Year of birth missing (living people)
Canadian music arrangers
Canadian classical composers
University of Toronto alumni
Canadian people of Chinese descent
Chinese classical composers
Chinese film score composers
Chinese male classical composers
21st-century Canadian male musicians